Farm Tour... Here's to the Farmer is the eighth extended play (EP) by American country music singer Luke Bryan. It was released on September 23, 2016, by Capitol Nashville.

Background
The extended play was released prior to Bryan's annual Farm Tour concert series, held in October of every year. It was his first release to accompany the Farm Tour.

Critical reception
Stephen Thomas Erlewine of AllMusic rated the EP three-and-a-half stars out of five, writing that Here's to the Farmer is "a bright, sentimental little record, one that feels more like the old Luke Bryan than the spangly, modern 2015 album Kill the Lights." Billy Dukes of Taste of Country described the EP as "a slice-of-life album that paints beautiful images of the American heartland," and wrote that "Bryan's storytelling is honest and his moral compass pointed true north during each song." Chuck Dauphin of Sounds Like Nashville voiced his appreciation for the more traditional country style of Here's to the Farmer, writing that "it makes for a little bit different appreciation of an artist, and shows another side of what he can do." He also said that the EP was "one of his most entertaining [bodies of work] in quite a while."

Commercial performance
Farm Tour... Here's to the Farmer debuted at number four on the US Billboard 200 chart with 34,000 units, including 32,000 in traditional album sales, making it Bryan's ninth top 10 on the albums chart. It also debuted at No. 1 on the Top Country Albums chart.

Track listing

Charts

Weekly charts

Year-end charts

References

2016 EPs
Capitol Records EPs
Luke Bryan EPs